Benjamin Lee Tollitt (born 30 November 1994) is an English professional footballer who plays as a winger for National League club Oldham Athletic.

Career

Widnes / Skelmersdale United
Born in Liverpool, Tollitt joined Widnes in the summer of 2013 after being released by Everton. He made his starting debut for the club on 25 September.

Tollitt scored his first goal in a 1–4 home defeat to Atherton Collieries. He finished his first senior season with 23 league appearances and eight goals.

On 27 September 2014, Tollitt scored a hat-trick in a 4–2 home win against Daisy Hill. In November, he joined Skelmersdale United in a dual-registration deal, making his debut for the club in a 1–1 draw against Grantham Town.

Portsmouth
In July 2015, Tollitt went on a trial at Portsmouth, making a four-minute appearance in the club's pre-season friendly against Havant & Waterlooville. On 15 July he signed a one-year deal with Pompey, with an option of an extension.

Tollitt made his professional debut on 12 August, coming off the bench in a 2–1 Football League Cup home win against Derby County. He scored his first goal for Portsmouth in a 6–0 win over York City on 24 November 2015.

Tranmere Rovers (loan) 
In September 2016, Tollitt joined Tranmere Rovers on loan from Portsmouth.

Tranmere Rovers 
On 9 December, he signed a permanent deal with Rovers, running until 2019.

On 21 December 2018, Tollitt joined National League side Wrexham on a short-term loan.

He was released by Tranmere at the end of the 2018–19 season.

Blackpool 
On 21 June 2019, he signed a two-year contract, plus a 12-month option, with Blackpool.

On 23 August 2019, Tollitt rejoined Wrexham on an initial short-term loan.

He was released by the club on 30 January 2020.

Oldham Athletic
In July 2022, Tollitt signed for newly relegated National League club Oldham Athletic on a one-year deal having spent the previous two seasons with National League North side AFC Fylde.

Career statistics

References

External links

Portsmouth profile

1997 births
Living people
Footballers from Liverpool
English footballers
Association football wingers
English Football League players
National League (English football) players
Northern Football League players
Everton F.C. players
Skelmersdale United F.C. players
Portsmouth F.C. players
Widnes F.C. players
Tranmere Rovers F.C. players
Wrexham A.F.C. players
Blackpool F.C. players
Macclesfield Town F.C. players
AFC Fylde players
Oldham Athletic A.F.C. players